Arthur Winston Crane (born 21 August 1941) was an Australian politician. Born in Perth, Western Australia, he was a farmer and grazier, and served as Senior Vice-President of the National Farmers' Federation. In 1990, he was elected to the Australian Senate as a Liberal Senator from Western Australia. For the 2001 election, he was demoted to fourth place on the Liberal ticket, replaced by the State President of the WA Liberal Party, David Johnston. Crane was defeated; his term expired in 2002.

References

Liberal Party of Australia members of the Parliament of Australia
Members of the Australian Senate for Western Australia
Members of the Australian Senate
1941 births
Living people
21st-century Australian politicians
20th-century Australian politicians